Astypalaea or Astypalaia, also known as Isthmus or Isthmos, was a town of ancient Greece in the southwest of the island of Cos, which the inhabitants abandoned in order to build Cos.

Its site is located near modern Kefalos.

References

Populated places in the ancient Aegean islands
Former populated places in Greece
Kos